Cyclorhiza may refer to:
 Cyclorhiza (copepod), a genus of copepods in the family Phyllodicolidae
 Cyclorhiza (plant), a genus of flowering plants in the family Apiaceae